Guðmundur Ingólfsson (28 April 1929 – 13 August 1987) was an Icelandic swimmer. He competed in the men's 100 metre backstroke at the 1948 Summer Olympics.

References

External links
 

1929 births
1987 deaths
Gudmundur Ingolfsson
Gudmundur Ingolfsson
Swimmers at the 1948 Summer Olympics
Gudmundur Ingolfsson